Tina Križan and Katarina Srebotnik were the defending champions but lost in the final 3–6, 7–5, 6–1 against Květa Hrdličková and Barbara Rittner.

Seeds
Champion seeds are indicated in bold text while text in italics indicates the round in which those seeds were eliminated.

 Alexandra Fusai /  Rita Grande (first round)
 Tathiana Garbin /  Janette Husárová (semifinals)
 Tina Križan /  Katarina Srebotnik (final)
 Kristie Boogert /  Magüi Serna (withdrew)

Draw

References
 2001 Estoril Open Women's Doubles Draw

2001 Women's Doubles
Doubles
Estoril Open